Albolagh (also Romanized as Ālbolāgh and Āl Bolāgh) is a village in Mokriyan-e Gharbi Rural District, in the Central District of Mahabad County, West Azerbaijan Province, Iran. At the 2006 census, its population was 145, in 26 families.

References 

Populated places in Mahabad County